The 2019 Grand Prix de Fourmies was the 87th edition of the Grand Prix de Fourmies road cycling one day race. It was held on 8 September 2019 as part of the UCI Europe Tour as a 1.HC-ranked event.

Teams
Twenty-four teams participated in the race, of which six are UCI WorldTour teams, fourteen are UCI Professional Continental teams, and four are UCI Continental teams. Each team entered seven riders, and of the 168 riders that started the race, only 143 riders finished.

UCI WorldTeams

 
 
 
 
 
 

UCI Professional Continental Teams

 
 
 
 
 
 
 
 
 
 
 
 
 
 

UCI Continental Teams

Result

References

2019 UCI Europe Tour
2019 in French sport
Grand Prix de Fourmies